C. J. Roberts may refer to:

 John Roberts, Chief Justice of the United States (from 2005)

 C. J. Roberts (One Life to Live), a character on soap opera One Life to Live
 C. J. Roberts (cornerback) (born 1991), American football cornerback
 C. J. Roberts (1846-1925), Australian politician